Mo Dao Zu Shi is a donghua ONA series aired from 2018 to 2021, based on the novel of the same name written by Mo Xiang Tong Xiu. The series depicts a fictional Xianxia world where humans attempt to cultivate to a state of immortality, known as Xian. The animation was produced by Tencent Penguin Pictures and B.C May Pictures, in collaboration with 729 Voice Studio. 

The first season, titled Qian Chen Pian, aired from July 9 to October 6, 2018, on Tencent Video for 15 episodes. The second season, titled Xian Yun Pian, aired from August 3 to August 31, 2019, for 8 episodes. A chibi series, titled Mo Dao Zu Shi Q, aired from July 31, 2020, to January 29, 2021, and ran for 30 episodes. The third and final season, titled Wán Jié Piān, aired from August 7 to October 16, 2021, for 12 episodes.

The series won the Gold Award for "The Best Serial Animation" at the 15th China Animation Golden Dragon Awards. It also won "Best New Animation" at Xinguang Award; the 7th China Xi'an International Original Animation Competition.

Series overview

Episodes

Season 1 (2018)

Season 2 (2019)

Season 3 (2021)

References 

Mo Dao Zu Shi